ORP Orkan is an  and sister ship of  and .

The original project was prepared by the German Democratic Republic for its navy and was named Project 660 (Sassnitz class in NATO code). After the Unification of Germany the unfinished hulls were bought by the Polish Navy from VEB Peenewerft shipyard in Wolgast and successfully completed in Northern Shipyard in Gdańsk.

After its completion in 1992 the ship was incorporated into the 31st Rocket Warships Squadron, 3rd Ship Flotilla.

References

Orkan-class corvettes of the Polish Navy
1990 ships
Ships built in Wolgast